Damburneya bicolor is a species of plant in the family Lauraceae. It is endemic to Panama. It is threatened by habitat loss.

References

bicolor
Endemic flora of Panama
Endangered flora of North America
Taxonomy articles created by Polbot